The Sanctuary of St. Gabriel of Our Lady of Sorrows is located at the foot of the Gran Sasso, in the municipality of Isola del Gran Sasso, in Teramo province, Abruzzo region, Italy. The shrine receives an average of 2 million visitors a year and is thus one of the 15 most visited sanctuaries in the world.

The sanctuary of St. Gabriel of Our Lady of Sorrows includes four main facilities:

 the monastery, which houses the headquarters of the Passionists, where St. Gabriel died in 1862;
 the old church, built in 1908 in honor of St. Gabriel;
 the new church of reinforced concrete, glass and steel, from 1970, which is usually open on holidays to accommodate the large number of pilgrims (may contain 5/6 000 people);
 the press that publishes the Eco of Saint Gabriel, the monthly magazine linked to the activity of the sanctuary.

History 

Towards 1215, St. Francis of Assisi he founded a convent for his Franciscan order, in the municipality of Isola del Gran Sasso of Italy, which remained there until the time of the Napoleonic suppressions; This monastery is the present Sanctuary of St. Gabriel.

Apparently the patron of Assisi found himself at the foot of the Gran Sasso shrine dedicated to Our Lady Annunziata from which, probably in 1216, began the construction of a monastery and a church dedicated to the Immaculate.

In 1809 the monastery was abandoned by the followers of Saint Francis, following the suppression of the religious orders of the Napoleonic period, and their place was taken in 1847 by Passionists.

Remains today of the original building, the "Pozzo di San Francesco" and, on the ground floor of what was once the convent, the dining hall and monastery with the stone portals of the 16th century and with a series of 17th century frescoes depicting scenes from the life of St. Francis.
The urn containing the mortal remains of St. Gabriel, formerly preserved in the old church, has been translated into the new sanctuary. Pope John Paul II opened the crypt and tomb 30 June 1985.

In July 1929, Pope Pius XI raised the old sanctuary to the dignity of minor basilica.

Description

Old Sanctuary  
The church has a basilica plan with a monumental facade made up un.ripiano punctuated complaint double column group containing three each arranged in a triangle. The entry into marble has three portals whose major center topped by a painted architrave.

The real facade is decorated with statues of saints on a side porch from which there is the body of architecture punctuated large central arch complaint. Alongside arch, used to the blessings, they are portrayed two important scenes from the life of St Gabriel. The architrave of the façade is styled Greek temple, with painted San Gabriel surround by angels. Three other statues decorate the architrave.

At the side of the facade there are two buildings that house the Brotherhood of San Gabriel and cover the church proper. Appears only a bell tower, while to the right, looking towards the façade, there is the modern steeple. Above the transept is a slender and slim celestial dome in diameter. A second dome of the church is in the original temple, one used by St. Gabriel in life. He Baroque appearance. Between the left building the façade of the sanctuary is the body there is a garden with a porch.

The interior has three naves and baroque aspects. The vaults are painted in light blue, while the chapels there are no relevant artistic elements. The apse is decorated in the style early Christian with the saints portrayed in false recesses. San Gabriel on the top bezel is between two archangels: Saint Gabriel and Saint Michael. The columns are decorated with Ionic capitals.

At the bottom of the church, the ground floor there is the crypt with the body of the saint. The crypt is built in Gothic style with fake marble narrow and high arches, arabesques in gold out praying angels portraits.

New sanctuary  
The sanctuary is made like a Greek cross with four slender arms, but that connect by way of amp fans each end of the other arm. The roof is made of iron and rests above the entrance of the building that has a square concrete. Above this is the Iron Cross. The windows are green, placed in.maniera rhythmic and are rectangular.

The interior has lgnea cover on the roof and is very geometrically, since all three main enteate brought to the altar. It is located in the center of the church, resting on a marble platform that has diamond-shaped; while the apse is recognizable from a reddish glass decoration. At the altar, there are marble Baroque décor of the Crucified Jesus and the Holy Spirit venerated by two women, including Mother Teresa of Calcutta.

Pipe organ  
The Church has been deprived of a pipe organ from the year of completion until 2012, when it was decided to provide the structure with a tool that was also adapted to the large size of the Church itself. The renowned house organ Claudio Anselmi Tamburini was in charge of the work.

The installed organ is an instrument used, manufactured in 1961 by the German company Späth (Opus 737); It is located in one body, on corner between nave and choir transept right. The instrument has 3,200 pipes for a total of 49 registers on three manuals, the transmission is electric.

There have been various interventions to allow installation in the Sanctuary and to get to the phonic available today. After the purchase by the famous retailer of used Ladach organs, the organ was dismantled and shipped from Germany to the organ workshop in Asciano (SI) where he was put back on track the phonic material, restored the bellows and changed windchests . Furthermore, given a poor supply of reed stops and flying the registers to the third manual, three new records were added, including oboe 8 'and Item Celeste 8'.

The console has also been completely redone, has three manuals of 56 notes each (C1-Sol5) and concave-parallel pedal of 30 notes (C1-Fa3).

Devotion  

The urn with the remains of St. Gabriel in the modern sanctuary
The sanctuary of St. Gabriel is a very dear place of pilgrimage for young people. Two main events: one in March, one hundred days was an examination, to take a high school diploma, in which thousands of students from Abruzzo and Marche, arriving to the sanctuary, to pray for a Following the successful outcome, and in which the feathers are blessed; and another in the last week of August, it is celebrated the tent city during which hundreds of young people (but also not so young) camp for five days, giving life to a religious meeting.

Among the famous visitors of the shrine, Pope John Paul II and the then prefect of the Congregation for the Doctrine of the Faith, Joseph Ratzinger. The memory of these visits is demonstrated by the photos shown in the new sanctuary.

Art  
The modern sanctuary, to a design school and completed by the architect Gio Ponti Eugenio Abruzzini, houses fine examples of sacred art contemporary artists such as Enrico Accatino, Ugolino da Belluno, Guido Strazza, Tito Amodei, Nino Di Simone.

References

Churches in the province of Teramo
Saint Gabriel